is a yaoi manga series written and illustrated by Row Takakura. Seven individual chapters were published as a single tankōbon volume in July 2001 by Biblos, then reprinted in March 2007 by Enterbrain which had assumed the license. The volume presents six short stories, with the titular story featuring Yahiro, a substitute teacher, who begins having an affair with his student Kago.

The volume is licensed for an English language release in North America by Media Blasters, which released in April 2006.  It is licensed in French by Asuka, under the title Student Affair.

Media
Written and illustrated by Row Takakura, the seven chapters of ...But, I'm Your Teacher were serialized in Be x Boy in 1997, before being published in a single tankōbon volume in July 2001 by Biblos. Biblos declared bankruptcy in 2006, and the title was acquired by Enterbrain which reprinted the volume with new cover art on March 15, 2007, under their B's Lovey label.

In 2005, Media Blasters licensed the volume for an English language release in North America under its "Kitty Media" label; the volume was published on April 26, 2006. After the title moved from Biblos to Enterbrain, Kitty Media noted that when their current licensed expired, they would seek to renew with the new property holder.

References

External links
 
 Sequential Tart review

2001 manga
Drama anime and manga
Enterbrain manga
Kitty Media
Yaoi anime and manga